Tenkiller Ferry Lake, or more simply, "Lake Tenkiller," is a reservoir in eastern Oklahoma formed by the damming of the Illinois River. The earth-fill dam was constructed between 1947 and 1952 by the United States Army Corps of Engineers for purposes of flood control, hydroelectric power generation, water supply and recreation. It went into full operation in 1953.  The lake and dam were named for the Tenkiller family, prominent Cherokees who owned the land and ferry that were bought for the project. This is 6th largest lake in Oklahoma, based on water capacity.

Geography

One of the townships bordering this lake is Paradise Hill, at the far southwestern edge of the lake. It is known for its violent drop-offs, some going from a grown man's waist level to over his head. This is the cause of many deaths in the lake.

Electric power generation
The hydroelectric power station is remotely controlled from the control center at Fort Gibson Lake. Two generators, each rated for 17 megawatts, provide a total capacity of 34 megawatts (MWe). The facility can handle 40 MWe for a short period of time. However, the amount of power that can actually be generated depends heavily on the lake elevation at any given time.

Water supply
Originally, the amount of water delivered by the project was considered incidental, although the quality of water was much higher than that of the Arkansas River (the closest alternative source). Much of this water was expected to be used by the Kerr-McGee Nuclear Fuel Plant. That plant closed in 1975. The cities of Muskogee and Sallisaw are now major consumers.

Recreation
Attractions near the lake include scuba diving, camping, hiking, fishing, golfing, water sports, scenic nature, fishing, and hunting. There are also ten marinas, fourteen parks, 24 boat launching ramps, five floating restaurants, and many islands including Goat Island which is famous for the goats that inhabit it. Scuba divers can even see the ruins of old communities that were flooded by the lake, such as the original town of Cookson.

Other than the goats, many other animals inhabit the area including Canada geese, white tail deer, ducks, monarch butterflies, warblers, otters, mink, beaver, bear, mountain lion, wild hogs, wild turkey and bald eagles.

Tenkiller State Park, Cherokee Landing State Park, and several Corps parks are among the parks bordering the lake.

Wildlife Management Area
The upland portion is covered with oak and hickory. The riparian portion contains mostly willow, sycamore, hackberry, elm, ash and birch.

Notes

References

External links 

U.S. Army Corps of Engineers website
U.S. Army Corps of Engineers: Corps Lake Getaway
U.S. Army Corps of Engineers lake website
U.S. Army Corps of Engineers lake data
Lake Tenkiller Home Page
 Oklahoma Digital Maps: Digital Collections of Oklahoma and Indian Territory
Warner, Larkin; Daniel D. Badger; and Gerald M. Lage. U.S. Army Corps of Engineers Tulsa District. "Impact Study of the Construction and Operation of the Tenkiller Ferry Lake, Oklahoma. August 1973.
  

Protected areas of Cherokee County, Oklahoma
Protected areas of Sequoyah County, Oklahoma
Reservoirs in Oklahoma
Dams completed in 1952
Dams in Oklahoma
United States Army Corps of Engineers dams
Bodies of water of Cherokee County, Oklahoma
Bodies of water of Sequoyah County, Oklahoma
1952 establishments in Oklahoma
Illinois River (Oklahoma)